Dicraeus vagans is a species of fly in the family Chloropidae, the grass flies. It is found in the  Palearctic . The larva feeds on Bromus.

References

Oscinellinae
Insects described in 1838